Ainapur, Bijapur  is a village in the southern state of Karnataka, India. It is located in the Bijapur taluk of Bijapur district in Karnataka.

See also
 Districts of Karnataka

References

External links
 http://Bijapur.nic.in/

Villages in Bijapur district, Karnataka